Typhlops grivensis is a species of snake in the Typhlopidae family. It is found in Africa.

References

grivensis
Reptiles described in 1946